"Silence" is a song produced by American DJ and musician Marshmello featuring vocals from American singer-songwriter Khalid. Written by both, it was released by RCA Records on August 11, 2017. The dance track peaked at number 30 on the Billboard Hot 100 as well as number 3 on the UK charts, his first song to chart on the latter.

Background
On August 1, 2017, Marshmello made a surprise performance at a Khalid concert, hinting at an upcoming collaboration. On August 7, 2017, Marshmello first teased the single release with a photo of him and Khalid, captioning the single's title and release date.

In an interview with StarTribune, Khalid explains "the song reflects the dejection he said he felt moving around a lot as a kid, since his mom served in the military. (His dad died in a car accident at a young age)".

Critical reception
David Rishty of Billboard described the song as "a rumbling dance ballad that has the ingredients to take both acts to new heights in their flourishing careers". He opined that Khalid delivered "crooning, soulful vocals", while Marshmello's production is "vibrant" and "asserts simplicity, yet purpose". Erik of EDM Sauce called the song "an incredibly powerful track", and described Khalid's vocals as "booming and impressive". He wrote that "after the intense build up and lyrical perfection from Khalid we wanted an equally as impressive drop", but "we did not find it". Alex Ross of Vice called the song "a good Marshmello song", and wrote that Marshmello "cheated by getting Khalid to do the vocals". He thinks that it "sounds a bit like" Major Lazer's collaboration with Justin Bieber and MØ, "Cold Water". Rolling Stone wrote that the song has "shifting, snapping synths". Rap-Up felt that the song "blends soulful R&B with atmospheric electronic sounds". Broadway World described Khalid's vocals as "strong emotive", and thinks that Marshmello "adopted a slower tempo than his usual upbeat productions to give the release a silky smooth feel, before launching into his instantly recognisable chord-based drop".

Personnel
Credits adapted from Tidal.
 Marshmello – production
 Chris Galland – mix engineering
 Manny Marroquin – mix engineering
 Denis Kosiak – engineering
 Jeff Jackson – assistant engineering
 Robin Florent – assistant engineering

Charts

Weekly charts

Year-end charts

Decade-end charts

Certifications

See also
List of number-one dance singles of 2017 (U.S.)

References

2017 songs
2017 singles
Marshmello songs
Khalid (singer) songs
RCA Records singles
Songs written by Khalid (singer)
Songs written by Marshmello
American dance songs